Fullerton may refer to:

Places
Australia
 Fullerton Cove, New South Wales

Canada
 Cape Fullerton, Nunavut

India
 Fullerton Securities, a financial planning and wealth management product company 

United States
 Fullerton, California, a city in Orange County
 California State University, Fullerton (commonly CSUF), part of the California State University System
 Fullerton Arboretum, a botanical-garden located on the north-east corner of the CSUF campus.
 Fullerton College, the oldest continuously operating community college in California
 Fullerton Union High School, a high school created in 1893
 Fullerton (Amtrak station), a passenger rail and bus station
 Fullerton Municipal Airport, a Regional Relief airport
 Fullerton Police Department, established in 1904
 Fullerton Public Library, established in 1906
 Fullerton, Louisiana
 Fullerton, Maryland, an unincorporated community in Baltimore County
 Fullerton, Nebraska, a city in Nance County
 Fullerton Township, Nance County, Nebraska
 Fullerton, North Dakota, a city in Dickey County
 Fullerton, Pennsylvania, a census-designated place in Lehigh County
 Fullerton (CTA), a Chicago rapid transit station on the 'L'

United Kingdom
 Fullerton, Hampshire, on the river Test, between Andover and Stockbridge

Other uses
 Fullerton (surname)
 Fullerton Dam, a ruined former dam in western Oklahoma, U.S.
 Fullerton Line, a former train route in California, U.S.

See also
 The Fullerton Hotel Singapore
Fullarton (disambiguation)